Sleze were a short-lived American glam metal band from Seattle, Washington, formed in 1984. Although Sleze were mostly a cover band and went through several lineup changes before changing their name to Alice N' Chains in 1986 and breaking up a year later, its former members later formed other bands, most notably the influential grunge band Alice in Chains.

History 
Sleze was established in 1984 by guitarists Johnny Bacolas and Zoli Semanate, drummer James Bergstrom, and bassist Byron Hansen, all of whom attended Shorewood High School. While walking between classes one day at school, Bergstrom ran into Ken Elmer, a friend from the school marching band. Elmer knew that Bergstrom and his bandmates were looking for a singer and suggested they audition his stepbrother Layne Staley, who at that time went by the name Layne Elmer. Elmer said that Staley played drums but "he wants to be a singer". Bergstrom agreed and Elmer paid Staley a visit to encourage him to try out for the band. Despite what Elmer told Bergstrom, Staley's mother Nancy McCallum has claimed her son was hesitant and said, "Well, I'm not a singer", but his stepbrother replied, "Why don't you try out anyhow?" Staley agreed and an audition took place at the Bergstrom residence, where the band had their jam room set up in the basement.

Johnny Bacolas has given various interviews recalling how he and the other instrumentalists "were just blown away" by Staley despite him being "really shy, real timid" as he looked down while he sang but "the grain of his voice was there, the soul was there". Bacolas and the other three instrumentalists – Bergstrom, Semanate, and Hansen – have all said they are fairly certain the first song they played with Staley was "Looks That Kill" by Mötley Crüe and it was at that moment they knew they were onto something.

"When he got to the part, 'Now she's a cool cool black,' he could actually hit those notes. We were like, 'Oh my God! This is awesome!'" Bergstrom recalls with a laugh. "So you had that feeling, 'Here's this kid. He's got a great sounding voice. He's cool. He could sing on key. And he also had good range and he was soulful, though he was just a raw beginner.' So we knew we had something special, and we were like in heaven from then, man. We became a band."

Zoli Semanate had a similar impression of Staley, adding, "He had a really high voice, kind of Vince Neil-ish, he could nail that pretty good. So I was happy."
Bacolas also expressed his pleasure at finding Staley, saying, "Layne had his own thing, and I think that's what was the most appealing (thing) about him. He had a very distinctive voice. I didn't want another Morrison or another Rob Halford. We weren't looking for that. I don't know what we were looking for. We just kind of—we just found it."

Sleze went through several lineup changes before discussions arose about changing their name to Alice in Chains. Zoli Semanate left first and was replaced by guitarist Chris Markham. The band continued performing for a while as a quintet before Markham and Hansen would also eventually step down, and Jim Sheppard filled the bass slot. At some point, Bacolas temporarily left Sleze to jam with another band called Ascendant on bass, which would become his primary instrument throughout his later career, and Staley invited his friend Nick Pollock to play guitar. Eventually, Sheppard went back to his other band Sanctuary and Mike Mitchell filled the bass role before Bacolas rejoined.

In a 1985 airing of the television program, Town Meeting, featured on KOMO 4 Seattle, Staley and Bacolas are in attendance in the studio audience to protest censorship from the PMRC (Parents Music Resource Center). Frank Zappa was the guest speaker in opposition of the PMRC. At one point during the program, the host, Ken Schram, gives Staley an opportunity to speak into the microphone and Staley makes the following statement, directed to one of the co-founders of the PMRC and guest speaker on the program, Sally Nevius, "I play for a rock band called Sleze, and there's enough controversy on our name, more or less than our songs. We just signed with a local record company. I don't feel there's anything objectionable about any of our songs, but I don't feel anyone anyone else has the right to rate our songs, I mean, I'm the only one that has the right to rate my album, you don't have it."

In 1986, shortly after Bacolas rejoined the band, they changed their name to Alice N' Chains due to a conversation Bacolas had with Russ Klatt, who sang with another band called Slaughterhouse Five, about backstage passes.

Post-Sleze 
Two days after leaving Sleze, guitarist Zoli Semanate joined a punk rock band that would become known as The Dehumanizers, which garnered significant attention throughout the Seattle area in 1986 for their song "Kill Lou Guzzo", Jim Sheppard continued playing bass with Sanctuary until their break-up in 1992, and he along with a few other members of that band later formed Nevermore.

Meanwhile, the last known line-up of Sleze – Staley, Pollock, Bacolas, Bergstrom – continued as Alice N' Chains before breaking up on friendly terms in 1987 and moving onto other projects, most notably Alice in Chains.

Band members 

Original members
 Layne Staley – vocals
 Johnny Bacolas – guitar, bass
 Zoli Semanate – guitar
 Byron Hansen – bass
 James Bergstrom – drums

Later members
 Chris Markham – guitar
 Jim Sheppard – bass
 Nick Pollock – guitar
 Mike Mitchell – bass

References 

Layne Staley
Glam metal musical groups from Washington (state)
Musical groups established in 1984
Musical groups disestablished in 1986
Musical groups from Seattle